

Events

Pre-1600
 811 – Byzantine emperor Nikephoros I plunders the Bulgarian capital of Pliska and captures Khan Krum's treasury.
1319 – A Knights Hospitaller fleet scores a crushing victory over an Aydinid fleet off Chios.

1601–1900
1632 – Three hundred colonists bound for New France depart from Dieppe, France.
1677 – Scanian War: Denmark–Norway captures the harbor town of Marstrand from Sweden.
1793 – Kingdom of Prussia re-conquers Mainz from France.
1813 – Sir Thomas Maitland is appointed as the first Governor of Malta, transforming the island from a British protectorate to a de facto colony.
1821 – While the Mora Rebellion continues, Greeks capture Monemvasia Castle. Turkish troops and citizens are transferred to Asia Minor's coasts.
1829 – In the United States, William Austin Burt patents the typographer, a precursor to the typewriter.
1840 – The Province of Canada is created by the Act of Union.
1862 – American Civil War: Henry Halleck becomes general-in-chief of the Union Army.
1874 – Aires de Ornelas e Vasconcelos is appointed the Archbishop of the Portuguese colonial enclave of Goa, India.
1881 – The Boundary Treaty of 1881 between Chile and Argentina is signed in Buenos Aires.
1900 – Pressed by expanding immigration, Canada closes its doors to paupers and criminals.

1901–present
1903 – The Ford Motor Company sells its first car.
1908 – The Second Constitution accepted by the Ottomans.
1914 – Austria-Hungary issues a series of demands in an ultimatum to the Kingdom of Serbia demanding Serbia to allow the Austrians to determine who assassinated Archduke Franz Ferdinand. Serbia accepts all but one of those demands and Austria declares war on July 28.
1919 – Prince Regent Aleksander Karađorđević signs the decree establishing the University of Ljubljana
1921 – The Chinese Communist Party (CCP) is established at the founding National Congress.
1926 – Fox Film buys the patents of the Movietone sound system for recording sound onto film.
1927 – The first station of the Indian Broadcasting Company goes on the air in Bombay.
1936 – In Catalonia, Spain, the Unified Socialist Party of Catalonia is founded through the merger of Socialist and Communist parties.
1940 – The United States' Under Secretary of State Sumner Welles issues a declaration on the U.S. non-recognition policy of the Soviet annexation and incorporation of three Baltic states: Estonia, Latvia and Lithuania.
1942 – World War II: The German offensives Operation Edelweiss and Operation Braunschweig begin.
  1942   – Bulgarian poet and Communist leader Nikola Vaptsarov is executed by firing squad.
1943 – The Rayleigh bath chair murder occurred in Rayleigh, Essex, England.
1945 – The post-war legal processes against Philippe Pétain begin.
  1952   – General Muhammad Naguib leads the Free Officers Movement (formed by Gamal Abdel Nasser, the real power behind the coup) in overthrowing King Farouk of Egypt.
1961 – The Sandinista National Liberation Front is founded in Nicaragua.
1962 – Telstar relays the first publicly transmitted, live trans-Atlantic television program, featuring Walter Cronkite.
  1962   – The International Agreement on the Neutrality of Laos is signed.
  1962   – Jackie Robinson becomes the first African American to be inducted into the National Baseball Hall of Fame.
1967 – Detroit Riots: In Detroit, one of the worst riots in United States history begins on 12th Street in the predominantly African American inner city. It ultimately kills 43 people, injures 342 and burns about 1,400 buildings.
1968 – Glenville shootout: In Cleveland, Ohio, a violent shootout between a Black Militant organization and the Cleveland Police Department occurs. During the shootout, a riot begins and lasts for five days.
  1968   – The only successful hijacking of an El Al aircraft takes place when a Boeing 707 carrying ten crew and 38 passengers is taken over by three members of the Popular Front for the Liberation of Palestine. The aircraft was en route from Rome, to Lod, Israel.
1970 – Qaboos bin Said al Said becomes Sultan of Oman after overthrowing his father, Said bin Taimur initiating massive reforms, modernization programs and end to a decade long civil war.
1972 – The United States launches Landsat 1, the first Earth-resources satellite.
1974 – The Greek military junta collapses, and former Prime Minister Konstantinos Karamanlis is invited to lead the new government, beginning Greece's metapolitefsi era.
1980 – Phạm Tuân becomes the first Vietnamese citizen and the first Asian in space when he flies aboard the Soyuz 37 mission as an Intercosmos Research Cosmonaut.
1982 – Outside Santa Clarita, California, actor Vic Morrow and two children are killed when a helicopter crashes onto them while shooting a scene from Twilight Zone: The Movie. 
1983 – Thirteen Sri Lanka Army soldiers are killed after a deadly ambush by the militant Liberation Tigers of Tamil Eelam.
  1983   – Gimli Glider: Air Canada Flight 143 runs out of fuel and makes a deadstick landing at Gimli, Manitoba.
1988 – General Ne Win, effective ruler of Burma since 1962, resigns after pro-democracy protests.
1992 – A Vatican commission, led by Joseph Ratzinger, establishes that limiting certain rights of homosexual people and non-married couples is not equivalent to discrimination on grounds of race or gender.
  1992   – Abkhazia declares independence from Georgia.
1993 – China Northwest Airlines Flight 2119 crashes during takeoff from Yinchuan Xihuayuan Airport in Yinchuan, Ningxia, China, killing 55 people.
1995 – Comet Hale–Bopp is discovered; it becomes visible to the naked eye on Earth nearly a year later.
1997 – Digital Equipment Corporation files antitrust charges against chipmaker Intel.
1999 – ANA Flight 61 is hijacked in Tokyo, Japan by Yuji Nishizawa.
  1999   – Space Shuttle Columbia launches on STS-93, with Eileen Collins becoming the first female space shuttle commander. The shuttle also carried and deployed the Chandra X-ray Observatory.
2005 – Three bombs explode in the Naama Bay area of Sharm El Sheikh, Egypt, killing 88 people.
2010 – English-Irish boy band One Direction is formed by judge Simon Cowell on The X Factor (British series 7), later going on to finish at third place. It would go on to become one of the biggest boy bands in the world, and would be very influential on pop music of the 2010s.
2011 – A high-speed train rear-ends another on a viaduct on the Yongtaiwen railway line in Wenzhou, Zhejiang province, China, resulting in 40 deaths.
2012 – The Solar storm of 2012 was an unusually large coronal mass ejection that was emitted by the Sun which barely missed the Earth by nine days. If it hit, it would have caused up to US$2.6 trillion in damages to electrical equipment worldwide. 
2014 – TransAsia Airways Flight 222 crashes in Xixi village near Huxi, Penghu, during approach to Phengu Airport. Forty-eight of the 58 people on board are killed and five more people on the ground are injured.
2015 – NASA announces discovery of Kepler-452b by Kepler.
2016 – Kabul twin bombing occurred in the vicinity of Deh Mazang when protesters, mostly from the Shiite Hazara minority, were marching against route changing of the TUTAP power project. At least 80 people were killed and 260 were injured.
2018 – A wildfire in East Attica, Greece caused the death of 102 people. It was the deadliest wildfire in history of Greece and the second-deadliest in the world, in the 21st century, after the 2009 bushfires in Australia that killed 180.

Births

Pre-1600
1301 – Otto, Duke of Austria (d. 1339)
1339 – Louis I, Duke of Anjou (d. 1384)
1370 – Pier Paolo Vergerio the Elder, humanist (d. 1444 or 1445)
1401 – Francesco I Sforza, Italian husband of Bianca Maria Visconti (d. 1466)
1441 – Danjong of Joseon, King of Joseon (d. 1457)
1503 – Anne of Bohemia and Hungary (d. 1547)

1601–1900
1614 – Bonaventura Peeters the Elder, Flemish painter (d. 1652)
1635 – Adam Dollard des Ormeaux, New France garrison commander (d. 1660)
1649 – Pope Clement XI (d. 1721)
1705 – Francis Blomefield, English historian and author (d. 1752)
1713 – Luís António Verney, Portuguese philosopher and pedagogue (d. 1792)
1773 – Thomas Brisbane, Scottish general and politician, 6th Governor of New South Wales (d. 1860)
1775 – Étienne-Louis Malus, French physicist and mathematician (d. 1812)
1777 – Philipp Otto Runge, German painter and illustrator (d. 1810)
1796 – Franz Berwald, Swedish surgeon and composer (d. 1868)
1802 – Manuel María Lombardini, Mexican general and president (d. 1853)
1823 – Alexandre-Antonin Taché, Canadian archbishop and missionary (d. 1894)
1838 – Édouard Colonne, French violinist and conductor (d. 1910)
1851 – Peder Severin Krøyer, Norwegian-Danish painter (d. 1909)
1854 – Ernest Belfort Bax, English barrister, journalist, philosopher, men's rights advocate, socialist and historian (d. 1926)
1856 – Bal Gangadhar Tilak, Indian lawyer and journalist (d. 1920)
1864 – Apolinario Mabini, Filipino lawyer and politician, 1st Prime Minister of the Philippines (d. 1903)
1865 – Henry Norris, English businessman and politician (d. 1934)
1866 – Francesco Cilea, Italian composer and academic (d. 1950)
1878 – James Thomas Milton Anderson, Canadian lawyer and politician, 5th Premier of Saskatchewan (d. 1946)
1882 – Kâzım Karabekir, Turkish general and politician, 5th Speaker of the Grand National Assembly of Turkey (b. 1948)
1883 – Alan Brooke, 1st Viscount Alanbrooke, French-English field marshal and politician, Lord Lieutenant of the County of London (d. 1963)
1884 – Emil Jannings, Swiss-German actor (d. 1950)
1885 – Izaak Killam, Canadian financier and philanthropist (d. 1955)
  1885   – Georges V. Matchabelli, Georgian-American businessman, created Prince Matchabelli perfume (d. 1935)
1886 – Salvador de Madariaga, Spanish historian and diplomat (d. 1978)
  1886   – Walter H. Schottky, Swiss-German physicist and engineer (d. 1976)
1888 – Raymond Chandler, American crime novelist and screenwriter (d. 1959)
1891 – Louis T. Wright, American surgeon and civil rights activist (d. 1952)
1892 – Haile Selassie, Ethiopian emperor (d. 1975)
1894 – Arthur Treacher, English-American actor and television personality (d. 1975)
1895 – Aileen Pringle, American actress (d. 1989)
1898 – Daniel Cosío Villegas, Mexican historian, economist (d. 1976)
  1898   – Bengt Djurberg, Swedish actor and singer (d. 1941)
  1898   – Red Dutton, Canadian ice hockey player and coach (d. 1987)
  1898   – Herman Kruusenberg, Estonian wrestler (d. 1970)
  1898   – Jacob Marschak, Ukrainian-American economist, journalist, and author (d. 1977)
1899 – Gustav Heinemann, German lawyer and politician, 3rd President of West Germany (d. 1976)
1900 – Julia Davis Adams, American author and journalist (d. 1993)
  1900   – John Babcock, Canadian-American sergeant (d. 2010)
  1900   – Inger Margrethe Boberg, Danish folklore researcher and writer (d. 1957)

1901–present
1901 – Hank Worden, American actor and singer (d. 1992)
  1901   – Isabel Luberza Oppenheimer, Puerto Rican brothel owner and madam in barrio Maragüez, Ponce, Puerto Rico (d. 1974)
1905 – Leopold Engleitner, Austrian author and educator (d. 2013)
1906 – Vladimir Prelog, Croatian-Swiss chemist and academic, Nobel Prize laureate (d. 1998)
  1906   – Chandra Shekhar Azad, Indian activist (d. 1931)
1912 – M. H. Abrams, American author, critic, and academic (d. 2015)
  1912   – Michael Wilding, English actor (d. 1979)
1913 – Michael Foot, English journalist and politician, Secretary of State for Employment (d. 2010)
1914 – Nassos Daphnis, Greek-American painter (d.2010)
  1914   – Virgil Finlay, American illustrator (d. 1971)
  1914   – Elly Annie Schneider, German-American actress (d. 2004)
1916 – Laurel Martyn, Australian ballerina and choreographer (d. 2013)
1918 – Abraham Bueno de Mesquita, Dutch comedian and actor (d. 2005)
  1918   – Ruth Duccini, American actress (d. 2014)
  1918   – Pee Wee Reese, American baseball player and sportscaster (d. 1999)
1921 – Calvert DeForest, American actor (d. 2007)
1922 – Damiano Damiani, Italian director and screenwriter (d. 2013)
  1922   – Jenny Pike, Canadian WWII servicewoman and photographer (d. 2004)
1923 – Luis Aloma, Cuban-American baseball player (d. 1997)
  1923   – Morris Halle, Latvian-American linguist and academic (d. 2018)
  1923   – Amalia Mendoza, Mexican singer and actress (d. 2001)
1924 – Gavin Lambert, English-American screenwriter and author (d. 2005)
  1924   – Gazanfer Bilge, Turkish wrestler (d. 2008)
1925 – Tajuddin Ahmad, Bangladeshi politician, 1st Prime Minister of Bangladesh (d. 1975)
  1925   – Quett Masire, Botswana politician, the former Vice-President of Botswana (d. 2017)
  1925   – Alain Decaux, French historian and author (d. 2016)
  1925   – Gloria DeHaven, American actress and singer (d. 2016)
1926 – Ludvík Vaculík, Czech journalist and author (d. 2015)
1927 – Gérard Brach, French director and screenwriter (d. 2006)
1928 – Leon Fleisher, American pianist and conductor (d. 2020)
  1928   – Vera Rubin, American astronomer and academic (d. 2016)
  1928   – Hubert Selby, Jr., American author and screenwriter (d. 2004)
1929 – Danny Barcelona, American drummer (d. 2007)
  1929   – Lateef Jakande, Nigerian journalist and politician, 5th Governor of Lagos State (d. 2021)
1931 – Te Atairangikaahu, Māori queen (d. 2006)
  1931   – Claude Fournier, Canadian director, screenwriter, and cinematographer
  1931   – Guy Fournier, Canadian author and screenwriter
1933 – Raimund Abraham, Austrian architect, designed the Austrian Cultural Forum (d. 2010)
  1933   – Bert Convy, American actor, singer, and game show host (d. 1991)
  1933   – Benedict Groeschel, American priest, psychologist, and talk show host (d. 2014)
  1933   – Richard Rogers, Italian-English architect, designed the Millennium Dome and Lloyd's building (d. 2021)
1935 – Jim Hall, American race car driver
1936 – Don Drysdale, American baseball player and sportscaster (d. 1993)
  1936   – Anthony Kennedy, American lawyer and jurist
1937 – Dave Webster, American football player and engineer (d. 2006)
1938 – Juliet Anderson, American porn actress and producer (d. 2010)
  1938   – Ronny Cox, American singer-songwriter, guitarist, and actor
  1938   – Charles Harrelson, American murderer (d. 2007)
  1938   – Bert Newton, Australian actor and television host (d. 2021)
1940 – Danielle Collobert, French author, poet, and journalist (d. 1978)
  1940   – Don Imus, American radio host (d. 2019)
  1940   – Tommaso Padoa-Schioppa, Italian economist and politician, Italian Minister of Finance (d. 2010)
1941 – Christopher Andrew, English historian and academic
  1941   – Richie Evans, American race car driver (d. 1985)
  1941   – Sergio Mattarella, Italian lawyer, judge, and politician, 12th President of Italy
1942 – Sallyanne Atkinson, Australian journalist and politician, Lord Mayor of Brisbane
  1942   – Madeline Bell, American singer-songwriter 
  1942   – Richard E. Dauch, American businessman, co-founded American Axle (d. 2013)
  1942   – Dimitris Liantinis, Greek philosopher and author (d. 1998)
1943 – Randall Forsberg, American scientist (d. 2007)
  1943   – Tony Joe White, American singer-songwriter and guitarist (d. 2018)
1944 – Dino Danelli, American drummer 
  1944   – Maria João Pires, Portuguese pianist
1945 – Edward Gregson, English composer and educator
  1945   – Jon Sammels, English footballer
1946 – Andy Mackay, English oboe player and composer 
  1946   – René Ricard, American poet, painter, and critic (d. 2014)
1947 – Gardner Dozois, American journalist and author (d. 2018)
  1947   – David Essex, English singer-songwriter, and actor
  1947   – Torsten Palm, Swedish race car driver
  1947   – Robin Simon, English historian, critic, and academic
1948 – Ross Cranston, Australian-English lawyer, judge, and politician, Solicitor General for England and Wales
  1948   – John Cushnahan, Northern Irish educator and politician
  1948   – John Hall, American politician
  1948   – Stanisław Targosz, Polish general (d. 2013)
1949 – Clive Rice, South African cricketer and coach (d. 2015)
1950 – Alex Kozinski, Romanian-born American lawyer and judge
  1950   – Ian Thomas, Canadian singer-songwriter and guitarist
  1950   – Blair Thornton, Canadian guitarist and songwriter 
  1950   – Alan Turner, Australian cricketer
1952 – Paul Hibbert, Australian cricketer and coach (d. 2008)
  1952   – Bill Nyrop, American ice hockey player and coach (d. 1995)
  1952   – John Rutsey, Canadian drummer (d. 2008)
  1952   – Janis Siegel, American jazz singer
1953 – Graham Gooch, English cricketer and coach
  1953   – Najib Razak, Malaysian politician, 6th Prime Minister of Malaysia 
1957 – Jo Brand, English comedian, actress, and screenwriter
  1957   – Nikos Galis, American basketball player
  1957   – Theo van Gogh, Dutch actor, director, producer, and screenwriter (d. 2004)
  1957   – Quentin Willson, English TV presenter, Top Gear
1958 – Ken Green, American golfer
  1958   – Tomy Winata, Indonesian businessman and philanthropist, founded the Artha Graha Peduli Foundation
1959 – Nancy Savoca, American director, producer, and screenwriter
1960 – Gary Ella, Australian rugby player
  1960   – Susan Graham, American soprano and educator
  1960   – Al Perez, American wrestler
1961 – André Ducharme, Canadian comedian and author
  1961   – Michael Durant, American pilot and author
  1961   – Martin Gore, English singer-songwriter, guitarist, and producer 
  1961   – Woody Harrelson, American actor and activist
  1961   – Milind Gunaji, Indian actor, model, television show host, and author
1962 – Eriq La Salle, American actor, director, and producer
  1962   – Mark Laurie, Australian rugby league player
  1962   – Alain Lefèvre, Canadian pianist and composer
1963 – Slobodan Zivojinovic, Serbian tennis player
1964 – Uwe Barth, German politician
  1964   – Nick Menza, German drummer and songwriter (d. 2016)
1965 – Rob Dickinson, English singer-songwriter and guitarist 
  1965   – Slash, English-American guitarist, songwriter, and producer 
1967 – Philip Seymour Hoffman, American actor, director, and producer (d. 2014)
1968 – Elden Campbell, American basketball player
  1968   – Gary Payton, American basketball player and actor
  1968   – Stephanie Seymour, American model and actress
1969 – Andrew Cassels, Canadian ice hockey player and coach
  1969   – Raphael Warnock, American politician and minister
1970 – Charisma Carpenter, American actress
  1970   – Thea Dorn, German author and playwright
  1970   – Sam Watters, American singer-songwriter and producer 
  1970   – Saulius Skvernelis, 13th Prime Minister of Lithuania
1971 – Dalvin DeGrate, American rapper and producer 
  1971   – Alison Krauss, American singer-songwriter and fiddler
  1971   – Joel Stein, American journalist
1972 – Suat Kılıç, Turkish journalist, lawyer, and politician, Turkish Minister of Youth and Sports
  1972   – Floyd Reifer, Barbadian cricketer and coach
  1972   – Marlon Wayans, American actor, director, producer, and screenwriter
1973 – Nomar Garciaparra, American baseball player and sportscaster
  1973   – Fran Healy, Scottish singer-songwriter and guitarist
  1973   – Monica Lewinsky, American activist and former White House intern
  1973   – Himesh Reshammiya, Indian singer-songwriter, producer, actor, and director
  1973   – Andrea Scanavacca, Italian rugby player and manager
1974 – Terry Glenn, American football player and coach (d. 2017)
  1974   – Maurice Greene, American sprinter
  1974   – Rik Verbrugghe, Belgian cyclist
1975 – Dan Rogerson, English politician
1976 – Judit Polgár, Hungarian chess player
1977 – Scott Clemmensen, American ice hockey player and coach
  1977   – Gail Emms, English badminton player
  1977   – Néicer Reasco, Ecuadorian footballer
  1977   – Shawn Thornton, Canadian ice hockey player
1978 – Stuart Elliott, Northern Irish footballer
  1978   – Stefanie Sun, Singaporean singer-songwriter and pianist
  1978   – Lauren Groff, American novelist and short story writer
1979 – Perro Aguayo Jr., Mexican wrestler and promoter (d. 2015)
  1979   – Sotirios Kyrgiakos, Greek footballer
  1979   – Richard Sims, Zimbabwean cricketer
  1979   – Ricardo Sperafico, Brazilian race car driver
  1979   – Cathleen Tschirch, German sprinter
1980 – Sandeep Parikh, American actor, director, producer, and screenwriter
1981 – Steve Jocz, Canadian singer-songwriter, drummer, and director 
  1981   – Dmitriy Karpov, Kazakhstani decathlete
  1981   – Aleksandr Kulik, Estonian footballer
  1981   – Jarkko Nieminen, Finnish tennis player
1982 – Ömer Aysan Barış, Turkish footballer
  1982   – Joe Mather, American baseball player
  1982   – Gökhan Ünal, Turkish footballer
  1982   – Gerald Wallace, American basketball player
  1982   – Paul Wesley, American actor, director, and producer
1983 – Bec Hewitt, Australian actress
  1983   – Aaron Peirsol, American swimmer
  1983   – David Strettle, English rugby player
1984 – Walter Gargano, Uruguayan footballer
  1984   – Matthew Murphy, English singer and guitarist 
  1984   – Brandon Roy, American basketball player
  1984   – Celeste Thorson, American actress, producer, and screenwriter
1985 – Luis Ángel Landín, Mexican footballer
1986 – Aya Uchida, Japanese voice actress and singer
  1986   – Nelson Philippe, French race car driver
  1986   – Yelena Sokolova, Russian long jumper
1987 – Alessio Cerci, Italian footballer
  1987   – Felipe Dylon, Brazilian singer
  1987   – Serdar Kurtuluş, Turkish footballer
1989 – Daniel Radcliffe, English actor
  1989   – Donald Young, American tennis player
1990 – Kevin Reynolds, Canadian figure skater
1991 – Lauren Mitchell, Australian gymnast
  1991   – Jarrod Wallace, Australian rugby league footballer
1992 – Danny Ings, English footballer
1996 – Alexandra Andresen, Norwegian heiress and equestrian
  1996   – David Dobrik, Slovak YouTube personality
  2002 – Séléna Janicijevic, French tennis player

Deaths

Pre-1600
 955 – He Ning, Chinese chancellor (b. 898)
 997 – Nuh II, Samanid emir (b. 963)
1100 – Warner of Grez, French nobleman, relative of Godfrey of Bouillon
1227 – Qiu Chuji, Chinese religious leader, founded the Dragon Gate Taoism (b. 1148)
1298 – Thoros III, Armenian king (b. c. 1271)
1373 – Bridget of Sweden, Swedish mystic and saint, founded the Bridgettine Order (b. 1303)
1403 – Thomas Percy, 1st Earl of Worcester, English rebel (b. 1343)
1531 – Louis de Brézé, French husband of Diane de Poitiers
1536 – Henry FitzRoy, 1st Duke of Richmond and Somerset, English politician, Lord Lieutenant of Ireland (b. 1519)
1562 – Götz von Berlichingen, German knight and poet (b. 1480)
1584 – John Day, English printer (b. 1522)
1596 – Henry Carey, 1st Baron Hunsdon (b. 1526)

1601–1900
1645 – Michael I, Russian tsar (b. 1596)
1692 – Gilles Ménage, French lawyer, philologist, and scholar (b. 1613)
1727 – Simon Harcourt, 1st Viscount Harcourt, English politician, Lord Chancellor of Great Britain (b. 1661)
1757 – Domenico Scarlatti, Italian harpsichord player and composer (b. 1685)
1773 – George Edwards, English biologist and ornithologist (b. 1693)
1781 – John Joachim Zubly, Swiss-American pastor and politician (b. 1724)
1793 – Roger Sherman, American lawyer and politician (b. 1721)
1833 – Anselmo de la Cruz, Chilean politician, Chilean Minister of Finance (b. 1777)
1853 – Andries Pretorius, South African general (b. 1798)
1875 – Isaac Singer, American businessman, founded the Singer Corporation (b. 1811)
1878 – Carl von Rokitansky, Bohemian physician, pathologist, and politician (b. 1804)
1885 – Ulysses S. Grant, American general and politician, 18th President of the United States (b. 1822)

1901–present
1904 – John Douglas, English-Australian politician, 7th Premier of Queensland (b. 1828)
1909 – Frederick Holder, Australian politician, 19th Premier of South Australia (b. 1850)
1916 – William Ramsay, Scottish chemist and academic, Nobel Prize laureate (b. 1852)
1919 – Spyridon Lambros, Greek historian and politician, 100th Prime Minister of Greece (b. 1851)
1920 – Conrad Kohrs, German-American rancher and politician (b. 1835)
1924 – Frank Frost Abbott, American author and scholar (b. 1850)
1926 – Viktor Vasnetsov, Russian painter (b. 1848)
1927 – Reginald Dyer, British brigadier general (b. 1864)
1930 – Glenn Curtiss, American pilot and engineer (b. 1878)
1932 – Tenby Davies, Welsh runner (b. 1884)
1936 – Anna Abrikosova, Russian linguist (b. 1882)
1941 – George Lyman Kittredge, American scholar and educator (b. 1860)
  1941   – José Quiñones Gonzales, Peruvian soldier and pilot (b. 1914)
1942 – Adam Czerniaków, Polish engineer and politician (b. 1880)
  1942   – Andy Ducat, English cricketer and footballer (b. 1886)
1948 – D. W. Griffith, American actor, director, producer, and screenwriter (b. 1875)
1950 – Shigenori Tōgō, Japanese politician and diplomat, Japanese Minister of Foreign Affairs (b. 1882)
1951 – Robert J. Flaherty, American director and producer (b. 1884)
  1951   – Philippe Pétain, French general and politician, 119th Prime Minister of France (b. 1856)
1954 – Herman Groman, American runner (b. 1882)
1955 – Cordell Hull, American captain, lawyer, and politician, 47th United States Secretary of State, Nobel Prize laureate (b. 1871)
1957 – Bob Shiring, American football player and coach (b. 1870)
1966 – Montgomery Clift, American actor (b. 1920)
1968 – Henry Hallett Dale, English pharmacologist and physiologist, Nobel Prize laureate (b. 1875)
1971 – Van Heflin, American actor (b. 1910)
1972 – Esther Applin, American geologist and paleontologist (b. 1895)
1973 – Eddie Rickenbacker, American pilot and race car driver, founded Rickenbacker Motors (b. 1890)
1979 – Joseph Kessel, French journalist and author (b. 1898)
1980 – Sarto Fournier, Canadian lawyer and politician, 38th Mayor of Montreal (b. 1908)
  1980   – Keith Godchaux, American keyboard player and songwriter (b. 1948)
  1980   – Mollie Steimer, Ukrainian activist (b. 1897)
1982 – Vic Morrow, American actor (b. 1929)
1983 – Georges Auric, French composer (b. 1899)
1985 – Johnny Wardle, English cricketer and manager (b. 1923)
1989 – Donald Barthelme, American short story writer and novelist (b. 1931)
1990 – Kenjiro Takayanagi, Japanese engineer (b. 1899)
1996 – Jean Muir, American actress (b. 1911)
1997 – Chūhei Nambu, Japanese jumper and journalist (b. 1904)
1999 – Hassan II of Morocco (b. 1929)
2001 – Eudora Welty, American novelist and short story writer (b. 1909)
2002 – Leo McKern, Australian-English actor (b. 1920)
  2002   – William Luther Pierce, American activist and author (b. 1933)
  2002   – Chaim Potok, American novelist and rabbi (b. 1929)
  2002   – Clark Gesner, American author and composer (b. 1938)
2003 – James E. Davis, American police officer and politician (b. 1962)
2004 – Mehmood Ali, Indian actor, director, and producer (b. 1932)
  2004   – Carlos Paredes, Portuguese guitarist and composer (b. 1925)
  2004   – Piero Piccioni, Italian pianist, conductor, and composer (b. 1921)
2005 – Ted Greene, American guitarist and journalist (b. 1946)
2006 – Jean-Paul Desbiens, Canadian journalist and academic (b. 1927)
2007 – Ron Miller, American songwriter and producer (b. 1933)
  2007   – Mohammed Zahir Shah, Afghan king (b. 1914)
2008 – Kurt Furgler, Swiss lawyer and politician, 70th President of the Swiss Confederation (b. 1924)
2009 – E. Lynn Harris, American author and screenwriter (b. 1955)
2010 – Daniel Schorr, American journalist and author (b. 1916)
2011 – Amy Winehouse, English singer-songwriter (b. 1983)
2012 – Margaret Mahy, New Zealand author (b. 1936)
  2012   – Sally Ride, American physicist and astronaut (b. 1951)
  2012   – Lakshmi Sahgal, Indian soldier and politician (b. 1914)
  2012   – Esther Tusquets, Spanish publisher and author (b. 1936)
  2012   – José Luis Uribarri, Spanish television host and director (b. 1936)
2013 – Rona Anderson, Scottish actress (b. 1926)
  2013   – Pauline Clarke, English author (b. 1921)
  2013   – Arthur J. Collingsworth, American diplomat (b. 1944)
  2013   – Dominguinhos, Brazilian singer-songwriter and accordion player (b. 1941)
  2013   – Emile Griffith, American boxer and trainer (b. 1938)
  2013   – Kim Jong-hak, South Korean director and producer (b. 1951)
  2013   – Djalma Santos, Brazilian footballer (b. 1929)
2014 – Dora Bryan, English actress and restaurateur (b. 1923)
  2014   – Norman Leyden, American composer and conductor (b. 1917)
  2014   – Ariano Suassuna, Brazilian author and playwright (b. 1927)
  2014   – Jordan Tabor, English footballer (b. 1990)
2015 – Shigeko Kubota, Japanese-American sculptor and director (b. 1937)
  2015   – Don Oberdorfer, American journalist, author, and academic (b. 1931)
  2015   – William Wakefield Baum, American cardinal (b. 1926)
2017 – John Kundla, American basketball coach (b. 1916)

Holidays and observances
Birthday of Haile Selassie (Rastafari)
 Children's Day (Indonesia)
 Christian feast day:
 Bridget of Sweden
 Heiromartyr Phocas (Eastern Orthodox)
 John Cassian (Western Christianity)
 Liborius of Le Mans
 Margarita María
 Mercè Prat i Prat
 Rasyphus and Ravennus
 July 23 (Eastern Orthodox liturgics)
 National Remembrance Day (Papua New Guinea)
 Renaissance Day (Oman)
 Revolution Day (Egypt)

References

External links

 
 
 

Days of the year
July